Jack Robinson was a British racehorse trainer. He was Champion Trainer in 1905.

British racehorse trainers